Omar Figueroa Jr. (born December 13, 1989) is an American former professional boxer who competed from 2008 to 2022. who held the WBC lightweight title in 2014.

Amateur career
Figueroa had approximately 40 amateur bouts, mostly fought in Texas and Mexico, but quickly turned professional, admitting he "did not care for" the amateur ranks.

Professional career
On January 6, 2012, Figueroa won an upset TKO over undefeated Puerto Rican-American prospect Michael Pérez in a bout televised on Showtime. Figueroa would go on to win a total of six bouts in 2012, including his debut for Golden Boy Promotions, a second round knockout of Mexico's Ramon Ayala. Building on this success in 2013, Figueroa won a unanimous decision over Japan's Nihito Arakawa for the vacant WBC interim lightweight title, in a fight declared by the Showtime commentator Mauro Ranallo to be a candidate for 2013 Fight of the Year. Writer Scott Christ of the boxing blog Bad Left Hook later said of Figueroa and Arakawa's encounter: 

"This fight was unreal and has to be seen to be believed. The brutality was simply off the charts. They might not agree with it today, but I heard more than one person last night say that this was the best fight they've ever seen, or the best fight of the 2000s.

Figueroa Jr vs. Burns 
In 2015, Figueroa defeated former world titlist Ricky Burns via unanimous decision at the State Farm Arena in Hidalgo, Texas

Figueroa Jr vs. Molina Jr 
On 16 February, 2019, Figueroa Jr faced John Molina Jr. In a tough contest, Figueroa Jr managed to continuously beat Molina Jr to the punch and outbox Molina Jr, to win the fight via unanimous decision, 99-91, 98-92 and 97-93.

Figueroa Jr vs. Ugas 
In his next bout, Figueroa Jr fought Yordenis Ugas, ranked #5 by the WBC at welterweight. Ugas won the fight convincingly, winning 119-107 across all three scorecards.

Figueroa Jr. vs Ramos 
In his next bout, Figueroa Jr fought Abel Ramos, ranked #8 by the WBA at welterweight. After six rounds Figueroa Jr had taken a lot of punishment from Ramos, which prompted Figueroa Jr's trainer Joel Diaz to stop the fight after the end of the sixth round.

Professional boxing record

Personal life

Omar who is of Mexican descent, is the older brother of former boxing champion Brandon Figueroa.

See also
List of Mexican boxing world champions

References

External links

Omar Figueroa Jr - Profile, News Archive & Current Rankings at Box.Live

|-

1989 births
Living people
World Boxing Council champions
Light-welterweight boxers
American male boxers
American boxers of Mexican descent
World lightweight boxing champions
People from Weslaco, Texas
Boxers from Texas